Ronne Entrance is a broad southwest entrance of the George VI Sound where it opens from the southeast portion of the Bellingshausen Sea at the southwest side of Alexander Island, Antarctica. The south side of the Monteverdi Peninsula occupies the north portion of the Ronne Entrance while Ellsworth Land occupies the southern portion of the entrance. The entrance receives much ice throughout the whole year mainly because the entrance protrudes eastward into the adjacent George VI Sound and the George VI Ice Shelf from the southwest section, the Ronne Entrance is also prone to ice flow from the Bach Ice Shelf (which separates the south side of the Beethoven Peninsula from the north side of the Monteverdi Peninsula) as well as receiving ice from the Wilkins Ice Shelf (mainly from the southernmost end of the ice shelf). There are a few islands situated within the Ronne Entrance, mainly in the southwest area. Some of these islands include the Eklund Islands, DeAtley Island, Spaatz Island, Case Island and Smyley Island. It was discovered on a sledge journey through the sound in December 1940 by U.S. Polar explorer Finn Ronne and Carl Eklund of the US Antarctic Service (USAS), 1939–41, and named "Ronne Bay". Finn Ronne covered more miles by ski and sled dog than any other explorer in history and mapped the last unknown coastline on earth on his Ronne Antarctic Research Expedition in 1947.

Since 1940, the head of the bay has receded eastward into George VI Sound, altering the relationships on which the name was based. The name was therefore changed to Ronne Entrance, in keeping with the physical characteristics of the feature. Named after the Ronne family, of which the father, Martin Rønne, was a member of the Norwegian expedition under Amundsen, 1910–12, and the Byrd Antarctic Expedition 1928–30; the son, Finn Ronne (d.1980), was a member of the Byrd Antarctic Expedition, 1933–35, and the USAS, 1939–41. As captain, Finn Ronne headed the Ronne Antarctic Research Expedition, 1947–49 and became scientific and military leader for a U.S. Weddell Sea base.  His wife, Edith Ronne, became the first woman to overwinter on the continent.

References 

Straits of Antarctica
Argentine Antarctica
British Antarctic Territory
Chilean Antarctic Territory
Bays of Antarctica
Bodies of water of Alexander Island